Edward Gibson (1668/9–1701) was an English portrait painter and draughtsman. He excelled in crayon work.

Life 

Edward Gibson was perhaps the son of Richard Gibson by his wife, Anne, née Sheppard. He was the nephew of William Gibson, from whom he received instruction in painting. He commenced painting portraits in oil, but subsequently found more employment in crayons. In this line he "showed some genius", says Lionel Cust, and was making "great progress" when he died in January 1701 in his thirty-third year. He resided in Catherine Street, Strand, and was buried at Richmond, Surrey.

Works 
He drew his own portrait in crayons twice, in one dressed as a Chinese, in the other as a Quaker. One portrait of himself, dated 1690, was at Tart Hall, and another, dated 1696, was formerly in Sir Thomas Lawrence's collection, and was sold at Christie's on 27 March 1866.

References

Sources 
 
 

Attribution:

Further reading
 

 

17th-century English painters
1701 deaths
English portrait painters
1660s births